Kōfūdai Station (光風台駅) is the name of two train stations in Japan:

 Kōfūdai Station (Chiba)
 Kōfūdai Station (Osaka)